Neoporus is a genus of beetle in the family Dytiscidae.  These are the predaceous diving beetles, a family of water beetles.  Their larvae are commonly known as water tigers.  Neoporus is one of over 160 genera in family Dytiscidae.


Species 

 N. arizonicus Fall, 1917
 N. asidytus Young, 1984
 N. aulicus Aubé, 1838
 N. baelus Young, 1984
 N. blanchardi Sherman, 1913
 N. carolinus Fall, 1917
 N. cimicoides Sharp, 1882
 N. clypealis Sharp, 1882
 N. dilatatus Fall, 1917
 N. dimidiatus Gemminger and Harold, 1868
 N. dixianus Fall, 1917
 N. effeminatus Fall, 1923
 N. floridanus Young, 1940
 N. gaudens Fall, 1923
 N. hebes Fall, 1923
 N. helocrinus Young, 1967
 N. hybridus Aubé, 1838
 N. latocavus Wolfe, 1984
 N. lecontei Nilsson, 2001
 N. lobatus Sharp, 1882
 N. lynceus Sharp, 1882
 N. mellitus LeConte, 1855
 N. pratus Wolfe, 1984
 N. psammodytes Young, 1978
 N. rheocrinus Young, 1967
 N. semiflavus Fall, 1917
 N. shermani Fall, 1917
 N. spurius LeConte, 1855
 N. striatopunctatus F. E. Melsheimer, 1844
 N. sulcipennis Fall, 1917
 N. superioris J. Balfour-Browne, 1944
 N. tennetum Wolfe, 1984
 N. tigrinus Fall, 1917
 N. undulatus Say, 1823
 N. uniformis Blatchley, 1925
 N. venustus LeConte, 1855
 N. vitiosus LeConte, 1855
 N. vittatipennis Gemminger and Harold, 1868
 N. vittatus LeConte, 1855

Notes

References 
 

Dytiscidae